Interview (stylized ĭn′terview) is the eighth album by British progressive rock band Gentle Giant. The album was released in 1976.

It is a concept album conceived as a radio interview. Three of the tracks integrate brief "interview" sections which were staged in the studio.  The title song has lyrics derived from the type of question and answer dialogue they had encountered while talking to the music press. This album was critically and commercially less successful than their previous album Free Hand.

In addition to the usual stereo version the album was also mixed in 4-channel quadraphonic sound in 1976. The 4-channel mix was not used until 2012 when it finally appeared on DVD with encoding in multichannel LPCM, DTS and Dolby Digital surround sound formats.

Track listing
(Copyright Clipchoice Ltd. & Moth Music, Inc.)

Personnel
Gentle Giant
Gary Green – electric guitar , acoustic guitar , alto recorder , backing vocals
Kerry Minnear – Minimoog , piano , Hammond organ , Clavinet , electric piano , synthesizer , RMI Electra Piano , clavichord , marimba , percussion , lead vocals on tracks 3, 7, backing vocals
Derek Shulman – lead vocals, alto saxophone , percussion 
Ray Shulman – bass guitar , electric violin , violin , 12 string guitar , percussion , backing vocals
John Weathers – drums, tambourine , percussion , finger cymbal , cowbell , cabasa , güiro , gong , backing vocals, co-lead vocals 

Additional personnel
Phil Sutcliffe – interviewer

Charts

Release details
1976, UK, Chrysalis Records CHR-1115, release date 23 April 1976, LP
1976, U.S., Capitol Records ST-11532, release date 4 May 1976, LP
1976, U.S., Capitol Records ST-11532, release date ? April 1976, Cassette
?, U.S., Capitol Records SN-16047, release date ? ? ?, LP (reissue without picture sleeve)
?, U.S., Capitol Records CD 18732, release date ? ? ?, CD
1994, UK, Terrapin Trucking TRUCKCD005, release date ? July 1994, CD (re-master)
1996, U.S., One Way CD 18467, release date ? ? 1996, CD
1999, UK, BGO BGOCD421, release date 1 October 1999, CD (2 x CD with Free Hand) (This version is missing a few seconds of dialogue at the end of the "Interview" album.)
2005, UK, DRT Entertainment RTÉ 00357, release date 13 September 2005, CD (35th Anniversary Enhanced Re-Master)
2012, UK, EMI/Chrysalis Records CHRDX 1115, CD + DVD (DVD contains audio enhanced tracks of the album)

References

The Rough Guide to Rock (2nd ed.). Rough Guides Ltd. 1999. p. 424.

1976 albums
Gentle Giant albums
Capitol Records albums
Concept albums
Chrysalis Records albums